Waking Up is the third studio album from Bethany Dillon. It was released on April 3, 2007. It contains the singles "the Kingdom", and "When You Love Someone".

Track listing
 "The Kingdom" – 4:03
 "Come Find Me" – 4:31
 "Waking Up" – 4:06
 "Something There" – 3:24
 "Let Your Light Shine" – 4:01
 "Change" – 3:28
 "Top of the World" – 3:54
 "Tell Me" – 4:36
 "Are You Sure?" – 4:23
 "When You Love Someone" – 3:29
 "You Could Be The One" – 3:53
 "Beggar's Heart" – 4:45
 "You Are On Our Side" – 5:08

References

2007 albums
Bethany Dillon albums